The Come On Over Tour was the debut concert tour by Canadian singer-songwriter Shania Twain. Visiting North America, Australia and Europe, the tour supported of her third studio album Come On Over (1997). Deemed one of the most anticipated tours of the 1990s, the trek became one of the  highest-grossing tours in 1990s, along with becoming one of the biggest tours by a female musician of any genre. The tour was seen by over two million spectators and earned over 80 million dollars. Additional accolades include being named the "Country Tour of the Year" in 1998 and 1999 by Pollstar Concert Industry Awards. Supporting Twain on the tour was family band Leahy and country artist Shane Minor. The tour was sponsored by Gitano Jeans.

Background
The tour was announced by various media outlets in March 1998, when Twain's third album was certified five times platinum in the United States. The tour, named after the same album, was planned to begin in May 1998  in Sudbury (near Twain's hometown of Timmins) and ending December 1998 in Phoenix, Arizona. It became very popular, with many dates selling out within hours of the announcement. Most notably, the concerts at the Pine Knob Music Theatre in Clarkston, Michigan sold out in 29 minutes, a feat previously conquered by Metallica and The Who. The response led Twain to add additional dates in North America along with dates in Australia and the United Kingdom.

To introduce the tour, Twain narrated:

It's going to be a big party that I happen to be hosting. Pretty high energy for most of the time. I ['ll] get out on tour, I’ll be able to do a full show of original songs that people will be familiar with. It's going to be ideal, almost like I couldn’t have planned it better, even though I didn’t really plan it at all. I am glad I waited, and I’m going to give it all I’ve got to make it everything the fans have been waiting for.

By 1998, Twain was an established country music sensation, selling over ten million albums, with her latest album selling over five million in the United States. Rumors began circulating within the media concerning Twain's vocal ability. Many critics saw Twain as a "studio voice", doubting her ability to sing live. The success of Come On Over prompted Twain to tour. Twain dismissed rumors stating at that time, she would rather focus on producing her next album than touring. She responded, "You have a huge record, you do a huge tour, you come home exhausted and you somehow have to turn out another record, fast, that everyone will compare to the first one. It was a very good decision not to tour in '95 [...] If I had toured then, [the tour] this year would not have been nearly as exciting." She further asserted she wanted to tour in 1995 but wanted the anticipation of a tour to build amongst her fan base. She further states she was very confident as a live performer, dismissing critics who felt Twain couldn't translate her success to the stage. Twain says she was proud to have her album, The Woman in Me, sell so well without a supporting tour. "It didn't make sense financially of course. I could have capitalized. But my intentions were to have a longer career than just that year."

Rehearsals began in May 1998 at the Olympic Center in Lake Placid, New York. Twain says she was shocked to hear of the success of the tour, believing she would only sellout floor seats in the arenas and amphitheaters where the concerts were performed. She would later comment on how comfortable she felt with touring compared to her early days of success as a nightclub performer in Ontario. Twain recalls traveling in busted vans, hauling her own equipment and the minimal wages she received during that time. However, she states she was very young and saw it as an opportunity to have fun. To help promote the tour, Twain held radio contests in the markets where she would perform. The winner would appear on stage with Twain to perform her first single, "What Made You Say That", with the band, while Twain performed the backing vocals. On March 18, 1999, at the Corel Centre in Ottawa, 14 year old Avril Lavigne performed on stage with Twain and was later signed to Arista Records the following year. For a similar contest, Twain chose nine singers and fours drummers from Shaker Heights High School to perform onstage with her at Blossom Music Center in Cuyahoga Falls, Ohio.

On its premiere concert, Twain became emotional after performing "From This Moment On". After composing herself, she told the audience about the death of her parents and explained how it motivated her to have the life she's able to live now. She continued her story stating the last performance her parents saw of her was when she opened for Bernadette Peters and the Toronto Symphony Orchestra at the Roy Thomson Hall on February 8, 1987. While on the road, Twain received additional recognition, earning two Grammy Awards, diamond certification on both The Woman in Me and Come On Over and she appeared on VH1 Divas alongside Celine Dion, Gloria Estefan, Mariah Carey and Aretha Franklin. Furthermore, Twain participated in a benefit concert for Amnesty International in Paris, France at the Palais Omnisports de Paris-Bercy. She performed with Bruce Springsteen, Peter Gabriel, Alanis Morissette, and Radiohead. To continue her philanthropy, Twain visited survivors of the Columbine High School massacre and donated the proceeds of her May 11, 1999 concert at Coors Amphitheatre to the high school.

Opening acts
Leahy (North America—Leg 1 & 2) (Europe)
Shane Minor (North America—Leg 2 & 3) (select dates)

Set list

North America (leg 1 and 2), Australia and Europe
"Man! I Feel Like a Woman!"
"Honey, I'm Home"
"You Win My Love"
"Whose Bed Have Your Boots Been Under?"
"You're Still the One"
"I Won't Leave You Lonely"
"Come on Over"
"Love Gets Me Every Time"
"I'm Holdin' On to Love (To Save My Life)"
"When"
Medley: "Home Ain't Where His Heart Is (Anymore)" / "The Woman in Me (Needs the Man in You)" / "You've Got a Way"
"That Don't Impress Me Much"
"If It Don't Take Two" 3
"Black Eyes, Blue Tears"
"God Bless the Child"
"What Made You Say That" 1
"No One Needs to Know"
"Any Man of Mine"
"Don't Be Stupid (You Know I Love You)" 2
"From This Moment On"
Encore
"(If You're Not in It for Love) I'm Outta Here!" (contains elements of "Any Man of Mine")
"Rock This Country!"

1Performed by local contest winner only, with Twain performing backing vocals. 2Performed with opening act, Leahy, for the first two North American legs and Europe. 3Performed at select dates.

North America (leg 3)
"Honey, I'm Home"
"Whose Bed Have Your Boots Been Under?"
"Love Gets Me Every Time"
"I Won't Leave You Lonely"
"When"
"That Don't Impress Me Much"
"Any Man of Mine"
"No One Needs to Know"
"Come on Over"
"You're Still the One"
"Rock This Country!"
"God Bless the Child"
"I'm Holdin' On to Love (To Save My Life)"
"Man! I Feel Like a Woman!"
"From This Moment On"
Encore
"You Win My Love"
"Don't Be Stupid (You Know I Love You)"
"(If You're Not in It for Love) I'm Outta Here!"

Band
 Marc Muller – pedal steel, guitar
 Randal Waller – guitar
 Brent Barcus – guitar
 Andy Cichon – bass
 J. D. Blair – drums
 Roddy Chong – fiddle, guitar, mandolin, percussion
 Allison Cornell – fiddle, keyboards, mandolin
 Hardy Hemphill – keyboards, percussion, harmonica, accordion
 Cory Churko – guitar, fiddle

Tour dates

Festivals and other miscellaneous performances
This concert was a part of Summerfest
This concert was a part of Westfair County Fair
This concert was a part of Great New York State Fair
This concert was a part of Z-100's Annual Jingle Ball
This concert was a part of Houston Livestock Show and Rodeo

Box office score data

Broadcasts and recordings

Twain filmed the tour on three separate occasions. For video release, the concert at the Reunion Arena in Dallas on September 12, 1998. It featured Twain performing all of her hit songs from her first three albums. The show aired live on DirecTV for its customers at no additional cost. The footage was released the following year titled Live. The video was certified platinum by the RIAA for shipments exceeding 100,000 units. In 1999, the concerts at the Bayfront Park Amphitheatre were filmed for a concert special airing on TNN. The special entitled Shania Twain: Winter Break gave the viewer a behind-the-scenes look of the tour and Twain's personal life. At the concerts, Twain was joined onstage by English recording artist Elton John, to perform "You're Still the One", "Something About the Way You Look Tonight" and "Amneris' Letter". On January 16, 1999, Twain was also joined by American boyband, the Backstreet Boys to perform their hit, "All I Have to Give" and Twain's "From This Moment On". The special aired on August 30, 1999.

After the release of her "Live" video, Twain filmed an additional concert special at the Texas Stadium in Irving, Texas. Named Come On Over, Twain performed in front of 40,000 spectators for the special, which aired on CBS on Thanksgiving night. In 2001, both specials were released to DVD titled The Specials, showing highlights from both concerts. Twain's benefit concert in Paris The Paris Concert for Amnesty, filmed on December 10, 1998, was highlighted on the DVD release titled The Paris Concert for Amnesty International. It featured only two performances, "Black Eyes, Blue Tears" and "You’re Still the One". The full concert aired on Viewers Choice in Canada.

"(If You're Not in It for Love) I'm Outta Here!"
"Honey, I'm Home"
"You Win My Love"
"You're Still the One"
"Black Eyes, Blue Tears"
"God Bless the Child"
"Don't Be Stupid (You Know I Love You)"
"Man! I Feel Like a Woman!"

Critical reception
Although the tour became a financial success, it received mixed feedback from music critics. John Young (Pittsburgh Post-Gazette) found the concert at the Coca-Cola Lakewood Amphitheater "too perfect". He writes: "There is nothing inherently wrong with big, loud pop music when its delivered with occasional country twinges. But Twain's music sounded almost too slick and perfectly packaged. Her hit 'You're Still the One,' lacked soul and fire, while most other tunes missing any distinguishing characteristics that made them Twain's own." The performance at the Spokane Veterans Memorial Arena was called "electrifying" by Chris Wille (The Spokesman-Review). He states: "The night's highlight? Practically every song. On 'Any Man [o]f Mine,' fans sang along. After '(If You're Not In It for Love) I'm Outta Here!' Twain disappeared through a giant drum, returning in yet another costume. She owned the crowd, and they loved every second of it".

References

External links
Twain's Official Website
Twain's Official Facebook Profile
Twain's Official Myspace

Shania Twain concert tours
1998 concert tours
1999 concert tours